Roaring Fork is a  long 2nd order tributary to Cherrystone Creek in Pittsylvania County, Virginia.

Course 
Roaring Fork rises in Climax, Virginia and then flows southeast to join Cherrystone Creek about 1.5 miles northwest of Chatham.

Watershed 
Roaring Fork drains  of area, receives about 45.9 in/year of precipitation, has a wetness index of 391.90, and is about 42% forested.

See also 
 List of Virginia Rivers

References 

Rivers of Virginia
Rivers of Pittsylvania County, Virginia
Tributaries of the Roanoke River